George Hummel (born 9 February 1976 in Mariental) is a Namibian former professional footballer who played as a defender.

References

External links

1976 births
Living people
People from Hardap Region
Namibian men's footballers
Association football defenders
Namibia international footballers
Chief Santos players
Hellenic F.C. players
Moroka Swallows F.C. players
FC Luch Vladivostok players
Jomo Cosmos F.C. players
Namibian expatriate footballers
Namibian expatriate sportspeople in South Africa
Expatriate soccer players in South Africa
Namibian expatriate sportspeople in Russia
Expatriate footballers in Russia